The Al-Ofouq class are four patrol vessels of Royal Navy of Oman as replacements for the  patrol vessels.

Following a competitive international tender in April 2012, ST Marine of Singapore won the USD703 million contract from the Omani Defence Ministry, beating off Damen Schelde Naval Shipbuilding and India's Goa Shipyard. The Al-Ofouq class is based on the  variant of the   currently used by the Republic of Singapore Navy.

Ships of class

Notes and references

External links 
 

Ships of the Royal Navy of Oman
Patrol ship classes